The George Lawrence Clarke Jr. House is located in Butler, Waukesha County, Wisconsin.

History
Originally, George Lawrence Clarke Jr. built the house as part of a new farmstead on property that had been his father's. The house has since been moved in order to save it from being demolished when the farmstead was being redeveloped to serve as a railroad yard. It was added to the State Register of Historic Places in 1994 and to the National Register of Historic Places the following year.

References

Houses on the National Register of Historic Places in Wisconsin
National Register of Historic Places in Waukesha County, Wisconsin
Houses in Waukesha County, Wisconsin
Greek Revival architecture in Wisconsin
Houses completed in 1850